Didymostoma euphranoralis is a moth in the family Crambidae. It was described by Francis Walker in 1859. It is found in Indonesia, where it has been recorded from Sulawesi.

References

Moths described in 1859
Spilomelinae